Duncan Sheik is the first album by the American singer-songwriter Duncan Sheik, released on Atlantic Records on May 20, 1996. Three singles were released from it, "Barely Breathing", "She Runs Away" and "Reasons for Living". The album was certified Gold by the Recording Industry Association of America (RIAA) on August 27, 1997, denoting sales of over 500,000 copies in the United States.

Recording
Sheik recorded around thirty songs for this album with the producer Rupert Hine while working out a deal with Atlantic (who took over his previous contract from Immortal Records), which left around 18 tracks unheard from these sessions. The only outtake from the album which saw the light, "View from the Other Side", was released as a B-side in 1997.

Critical reception

Kelly McCartney of AllMusic said the album is more than just the single "Barely Breathing", praising Sheik's songwriting for being "richly melodic and thoughtful" and Hine's production for giving the stories life throughout the track listing and multiple emotions that can be interpreted by the listeners, concluding that there is "something for everybody and a great record all around". James Hunter from Rolling Stone noted how Sheik's musicianship emulated UK acts like Talk Talk and The Smiths, concluding, "He may be enamored of antique pop, but Sheik is never merely retro. This [album] is a defiant debut – beautiful and benevolent of spirit." The Entertainment Weekly writer Steven Mirkin felt that Sheik's vocal performance was too restraint to allow for any "real emotional commitment" for the listeners to get out of the generic lyrics. Village Voice critic Robert Christgau dismissed Sheik as a second-rate "matinee idol" and "a whiner stupid enough to fall for the depressed wacko" and "stupid enough to blame it entirely on her", in reference to "Barely Breathing".

Release
The album was met with commercial success and was Gold-certified. It includes the Grammy-nominated hit single "Barely Breathing", which stayed on the Billboard Hot 100 singles chart for a record-breaking 55 (consecutive) weeks.

Track listing

Personnel
Adapted credits from the liner notes of Duncan Sheik.
Duncan Sheik - lead vocals (all tracks), harmony vocals (tracks 1, 2, 3, 6, 10), acoustic guitar (tracks 1, 3, 5, 7, 8, 10, 11), electric guitar (tracks 1, 3, 6, 7, 10), 12-string guitar (track 6), nylon string guitar (track 9), EBow (track 3), keyboards (tracks 4, 11), piano (tracks 3, 4, 7), organ (tracks 6, 8), sampling (track 3), drums (track 10), percussion (track 10), drum programming (tracks 4, 5, 6, 9, 10), accordion (track 9)
Fran Banish - electric lead guitar (tracks 1, 6, 9, 10), slide guitar (tracks 1, 3)
Howard Jones - outro piano on "Reasons for Living"
Rupert Hine - percussion (tracks 1, 3, 6), backing vocals (tracks 3, 10), keyboards (track 9)
Milo DeCruz (tracks 6, 10), Pino Palladino (tracks 1, 2, 3, 7) - bass guitar
Jean-Michel Biger - drums (tracks 1, 2, 3, 6, 7)
Strings by The London Session Orchestra, led by Gavyn Wright, directed by Minnie Matt and Gavyn Wright, arranged and conducted by Simon Hale (tracks 1, 2, 5, 8, 10)
Ruadhri Cushnan - infinite reverbs on "Home"
Technical
Ruadhri Cushnan, Stephen W. Tayler, Cyrille de Smet - recording engineers
Stephen W. Tayler - mixing
Tony Cousins - mastering
Julian Broad - photography
Richard Bates - art direction
Allen Hori - design

Certifications

References 

1996 debut albums
Albums produced by Rupert Hine
Atlantic Records albums
Duncan Sheik albums